Younge is an English language surname. Notable people with this name include:

Adrian Younge (born 1978), American composer, arranger and music producer
Fred Younge (1825–1870), English actor in Australia
Gary Younge (born 1969), British journalist with The Guardian
John Milton Younge (born 1955), US District Judge in Pennsylvania
Sammy Younge Jr. (1944–1966), American civil rights activist, murdered

English-language surnames